A leaf litter sieve is a piece of equipment used by entomologists, in particular by coleopterists (beetle collectors) (Cooter 1991, page 7) as an aid to finding invertebrates in leaf litter.

A typical leaf litter sieve consists of a gauze with holes of approximately 5 to 10 mm width. The entomologist places handfuls of leaf litter into the sieve, which is placed above a white sheet or tray. The sieve is shaken, and insects are separated from the leaf litter and fall out for inspection. Charles Valentine Riley details use of a simple sieve with a cloth bag.
 A more complex combination sieve is described by Hongfu.

See also 

 Tullgren funnel

References

 Cooter, Jonathan (1991) A Coleopterist's Handbook, The Amateur Entomologists' Society, 

Entomology equipment
Environmental Sampling Equipment